Curtis Reed is a fictional character from the soap opera, Days of Our Lives. He is portrayed by Nick Benedict.

Biography
Born Curtis Brown marries Kate Roberts in 1969 while living in Chicago. They have a son and daughter: Austin and Billie Reed. As a jazz musician, Curtis made several records, but his career is cut short when he became involved with the Mafia and has part of his ring finger cut off. Afterward, he becomes addicted to drugs and abusive toward his family, at one point raping his daughter. Kate begins having an affair with Bill Horton in 1979 (later revised to 1974). When she gets pregnant by him, Curtis finds out, beats her, and leaves her on the side of a road. He takes the two children before disappearing. 

Curtis changes his last name and his children's names; their birth names have never been revealed, but Curtis renamed them Austin and Billie Holiday Reed. Curtis and the kids go from city to city, often changing names due to his criminal activities. While Kate is searching for her children, Curtis contacts her and tells her that their children had died in a car wreck. Years later he appears in Salem and shoots John Black under Stefano DiMera's orders. Since Curtis did not kill John, DiMera refuses to pay him. An angry Curtis kidnaps Stefano and holds him on Smith Island until Kristen Blake pays Stefano's ransom.

Curtis is shot to death by Stefano on November 10, 1993, in a back alley behind Billie's apartment. He is discovered in the morning by Bo Brady and Wendy Reardon. Due to multiple seemingly conclusive pieces of evidence, Billie is arrested for his murder. It is not until the March 31, 1994 episode that Stefano is revealed to be the shooter. After this, he appeared as a ghost multiple times between May 2, 1995, and June 5, 2001.

References

External links
 Curtis at soapcentral.com

Days of Our Lives characters
Fictional characters from Illinois
Fictional musicians
Fictional gangsters
Fictional pedophiles
Fictional rapists
Television characters introduced in 1993
Fictional kidnappers
Male characters in television
Fictional characters incorrectly presumed dead